Jean Reboul (January 23, 1796 – May 28, 1864) was a French politician and poet of the Occitan language.

Reboul was born in Nîmes. He was member of the French National Assembly. In 1836, Reboul's first poem "Poésies" was published with a preface by Alexandre Dumas and a letter from Alphonse de Lamartine.

Reboul died in Nîmes.

External links 

 Meyers Konversations-Lexikon (1888–1889)

1796 births
1864 deaths
People from Nîmes
French poets
French politicians